Jean Parmentier may refer to:
 Jean Parmentier (diplomat) (1883–1936)
 Jean Parmentier (explorer) (1494–1529)